is a Japanese weightlifter.

He competed in Weightlifting at the 2008 Summer Olympics in the 56 kg division finishing ninth, with a new personal best of 259 kg. He beat his previous best by 6 kg.

He is 5 ft 1 inches tall and weighs 130 lb.

References
NBC profile
sports-reference

Japanese male weightlifters
1980 births
Living people
Weightlifters at the 2004 Summer Olympics
Weightlifters at the 2008 Summer Olympics
Olympic weightlifters of Japan
Nippon Sport Science University alumni
People from Gunma Prefecture
Weightlifters at the 2002 Asian Games
Weightlifters at the 2010 Asian Games
Asian Games competitors for Japan
20th-century Japanese people
21st-century Japanese people